The Thomson Developmental Road is a designated sealed road in south-west Queensland running between Longreach and Windorah. Towns en route are Stonehenge and Jundah, and the road crosses the Thomson River just west of Jundah. The road has no major intersections.

See also

 Highways in Australia
 List of highways in Queensland

References

Roads in Queensland